Several species of crabs share the name pebble crab:

Family Xanthidae, various species
Family Leucosiidae, various species:
Leucosia anatum (Herbst, 1783)

Animal common name disambiguation pages